Qazaxlar (also, Kazakhlar) is a village and municipality (Xəsili) in the Barda Rayon of Azerbaijan.

References

Populated places in Barda District